Mecyclothorax impressipennis is a species of ground beetle in the subfamily Psydrinae. It was described by Baehr in 2003.

References

impressipennis
Beetles described in 2003